Portage la Prairie is a provincial electoral division in the Canadian province of Manitoba. It has existed since the province's creation in 1870.

Portage la Prairie is located in southern Manitoba. It is bordered to the north by Lake Manitoba, to the south by Carman, to the west by Turtle Mountain, and to the east by Lakeside and Morris.

Portage la Prairie itself is in the central part of the riding. Other communities in the riding include Oakville, Newton, St. Marks, and Dakota Plains Wahpeton First Nation.

The riding's population in 1996 was 18,785. In 1999, the average family income was $45,302, and the unemployment rate was 7%. The health and service sector accounts for 18% of the riding's industry, followed by agriculture at 13%.

Thirteen per cent of Portage la Prairie's residents are aboriginal, while a further 6% are German.

Portage la Prairie has been held since by the Progressive Conservative Party for most of its history, although the New Democratic Party has increased its standing in the riding in recent years.

List of provincial representatives

Electoral results

1870 general election

1874 general election

1878 general election

1879 general election

1883 general election

1883 by-election

1886 general election

1888 by-election

1888 general election

1891 by-election

1892 general election

1896 general election

1899 general election

1902 by-election

1903 general election

1907 general election

1908 by-election

1910 general election

1914 general election

1915 general election

1920 general election

1922 general election

1927 general election

1932 general election

1933 by-election

1936 general election

1941 general election

1943 by-election

1945 general election

1949 general election

1953 general election

1958 general election

1959 general election

1962 general election

1966 general election

1969 general election

1973 general election

1977 general election

1981 general election

1986 general election

1988 general election

1990 general election

1992 by-election

1995 general election

1997 by-election

1999 general election

2003 general election

2007 general election

2011 general election

2016 general election

2019 general election

Previous boundaries

References

Manitoba provincial electoral districts
Portage la Prairie
1870 establishments in Manitoba